Tim Mahon is a New Zealand musician who played in the Plague, the Whizz Kids and Blam Blam Blam.  He was seriously injured in a road accident while on tour with Blam Blam Blam, leading to the band breaking up.

In 1983 he played bass and sang with Avant Garage and wrote an album track, "Breakin-it-up", which is on both the LP and cassette. Other musicians involved in Avant Garage included Ivan Zagni and Peter Scholes.

His solo album, Music From a Lightbulb (2003) for which he used the name The Moth, was written with Peter Van Gent.  Musicians playing on the album included Mark Bell, Ivan Zagni and Don McGlashan.

Tim was associated with the Otara Music Arts Centre as a council liaison. He was instrumental in forming bands such as Sistermatic (featuring Sina) and most notably the Otara Millionaires Club, e.g. on the Proud compilation created together with producer Alan Jansson. A later incarnation of the Otara Millionaires Club now named OMC had a worldwide hit with their song How Bizarre. In the 1990s he managed New Zealand girl group Ma-V-Elle. Rolling Stone described Mahon's role in enabling this music as being a 'white midwife for this new black music.'.

He now sells real estate in Auckland.

He currently plays bass in the band the Soul Agents, who include Blam Blam Blam member Mark Bell, he raises money for the Starship Foundation. This is a charity which supports Starship Children's Health in Auckland.

Discography

Albums

With The Whizz Kids

 "Occupational Hazard" 7" (1980) Ripper Records

With Blam Blam Blam

 Luxury Length (1982) Propeller/Festival Records

With Avant Garage
Garage To Gallery, 1983. Cassette, Avant Garage [no cat no.]
Avant Garage music, 1983. LP, Unsung Music (UN11)

With Dead Sea Scrolls
Dead Sea Scrolls, 1986, EP 12", Jayrem, JAY 136

Notes

References

 Dix, John, Stranded in Paradise, Paradise Publications, 1988.

External links
Blam Blam Blam at Simon Grigg' website
Where Are They Now at Simon Grigg' website
Short Interview with Tim Mahon (youtube)

New Zealand musicians
Living people
People educated at Westlake Boys High School
Year of birth missing (living people)